The 1915 Queensland state election was held on 22 May 1915.

The main parties in the election were the Liberal Party, led by Premier Digby Denham and the Labor Party, led by Leader of the Opposition T. J. Ryan.

By-elections
 On 26 October 1912, John Kessell (Liberal) replaced Edward Breslin (Labor) as the member for Port Curtis after the latter's election was declared void on 9 October 1912.
 On 26 October 1913, Ernest Bell (Liberal) replaced Arnold Wienholt (Liberal) as the member for Fassifern after the latter resigned on 28 March 1913.
 On 5 March 1914, Edward Archer (Liberal) replaced George Fox (Liberal), who had died on 27 January 1914, as the member for Normanby.

Retiring Members

Liberal
 Thomas Bouchard (South Brisbane)
 James Cribb (Bremer)
 Walter Paget (Mackay)
 Thomas Welsby (Merthyr)

Candidates
Sitting members at the time of the election are shown in bold text.

See also
 1915 Queensland state election
 Members of the Queensland Legislative Assembly, 1912–1915
 Members of the Queensland Legislative Assembly, 1915–1918
 List of political parties in Australia

References
 

Candidates for Queensland state elections